Red Hills is a locality and suburb in the local government area of Meander Valley, in the Launceston region of Tasmania. The Meander River forms part of the south-eastern boundary, while its tributary Western Creek forms the remainder. The railway tracks of the Western line pass through the north-eastern corner of the locality, crossing the B12 route (Mole Creek Road) at Lemana Junction. The 2016 census determined a population of 120 for the state suburb of Red Hills.

History
A hill named Red Hill is within the locality, and the name of the locality may be derived from it.

Road infrastructure
The B12 route (Mole Creek Road) runs south-west from the Bass Highway through the locality and then continues to Mole Creek, from which it provides access to many localities.

References

Localities of Meander Valley Council
Towns in Tasmania